This is a list of candidates for the 1932 New South Wales state election. The election was held on 11 June 1932.

Retiring Members

Labor
 Bill Ratcliffe (Barwon)

United Australia
 Richard Arthur (Mosman)
 Bruce Walker Sr (Hawkesbury)

Legislative Assembly
Sitting members are shown in bold text. Successful candidates are highlighted in the relevant colour. Where there is possible confusion, an asterisk (*) is also used.

See also
 Members of the New South Wales Legislative Assembly, 1932–1935

References

 

1932